Daniel Ruch (born January 1, 1983 in Ridgefield Park, New Jersey) is an assistant soccer coach with Virginia Wesleyan.  He played professionally for two years for the Virginia Beach Mariners of the USL Second Division and the Wilmington Hammerheads FC.

Ruch attended Ridgefield Park High School.  He then began his college soccer career at Lynchburg College before finishing it at Old Dominion University.  In 2006, he signed with the Virginia Beach Mariners of the USL Second Division before moving to the Wilmington Hammerheads FC of USL-2 in 2007. He retired from playing professionally after the 2007 season and was hired that fall by Virginia Wesleyan as a goalkeeper coach.

References

1983 births
Living people
American soccer coaches
American soccer players
Old Dominion Monarchs men's soccer players
People from Ridgefield Park, New Jersey
Ridgefield Park High School alumni

Soccer players from New Jersey
Sportspeople from Bergen County, New Jersey
USL First Division players
USL Second Division players
Virginia Beach Mariners players
Wilmington Hammerheads FC players
Association football goalkeepers